Weekend is a single from Daz Dillinger's album So So Gangsta. The song premiered on the DJ playlists on November 13, 2006 according to Radio & Records Rhythmic and Urban charts .

Song information
The song features fellow labelmate Johnta Austin, and was produced by Jermaine Dupri. It samples Los Angeles Negros' version of Murio La Flor.

Chart Awards

Chart Information

Daz Dillinger songs
Song recordings produced by Jermaine Dupri
Songs written by Daz Dillinger
Songs written by Jermaine Dupri
2006 songs